The wedding of Frederik, Crown Prince of Denmark, and Mary Donaldson took place on 14 May 2004 in the Copenhagen Cathedral.

Courtship and engagement 
Crown Prince Frederik of Denmark met Mary Donaldson on 16 September 2000, during the 2000 Summer Olympics in Sydney. Frederik identified himself as the Crown Prince of Denmark at the height of their courtship. Their relationship was kept low-profile, although some Danish media reported the two were dating. On 24 September 2003, it was announced that Frederik's mother, Queen Margrethe II, intended to give her consent to the marriage at the State Council meeting scheduled for 8 October 2003.

Frederik and Mary became officially engaged on 8 October 2003. Frederik presented Mary with an engagement ring featuring an emerald cut diamond and two emerald cut ruby baguettes. Prior to the wedding, Mary, who had previously been a dual citizen of Australia and the United Kingdom, was granted Danish citizenship. She also converted from Presbyterianism to the Lutheran Church of Denmark. The media portrayed Frederik's and Mary's relationship as a modern "fairytale" romance between a prince and a commoner.

Wedding ceremony 
The wedding ceremony of Frederik, Crown Prince of Denmark, and Mary Donaldson was held on 14 May 2004 in the Copenhagen Cathedral in Copenhagen, Denmark, followed by the wedding festivities at the Fredensborg Palace. Mary's sisters Jane Stephens and Patricia Bailey, and her friend Amber Petty served as bridesmaids, while Frederik's brother Prince Joachim of Denmark was the best man. Mary's nieces Erin and Kate Stephens and Madisson Woods were flower girls, and Frederik's nephew Prince Nikolai of Denmark and first cousin once removed Count Richard von Pfeil und Klein-Ellguth were pageboys.

Mary wore a wedding dress created by Danish fashion designer Uffe Frank with a veil first used by Crown Princess Margareta of Sweden, and then by her daughter Queen Ingrid of Denmark. The veil, made from Irish lace, was later worn by Ingrid's daughters Margrethe, Benedikte and Anne-Marie as well as her granddaughters, Alexia and Alexandra. (Nathalie would since wear it at her wedding in 2010). This makes Mary the first and only person not born into the family to wear the veil. Mary's wedding tiara was a gift from Queen Margrethe and Prince Henrik.

The bride's bouquet contained white roses, creme lathyrus, rhododendron, azalea, green gloriosa, Australian eucalyptus, and, in keeping with a Swedish royal tradition brought into the Danish royal family by the Swedish-born Queen Ingrid, a sprig of myrtle.

Music
Two choirs, the Copenhagen Boys Choir and the Church of Our Lady's choir; one orchestra, Concerto Copenhagen; and the fanfare ensemble from the Royal Life Guards Music Band played the music for the service.

The bride processed down the aisle accompanied by her father to the anthem "Zadok the Priest" which is traditionally used for British coronations. It was composed by George Frideric Handel for the coronation of Crown Prince Frederik's ancestor King George II of Great Britain, in 1727.

The congregational hymns sung at the wedding included "Den signede dag med fryd vi ser" and "Eternal Father, Strong to Save". The latter is traditionally associated with the maritime armed services. Crown Prince Frederik notably served with the Danish naval elite special operations forces, the Frogman Corps. The motet "Sicut cervus" by Giovanni Pierluigi da Palestrina was performed by the Copenhagen Boys Choir during the ceremony. The motet holds a special significance to the Danish royal family and was played at the Queen and Prince Consort's wedding in 1967, at King Frederik IX's funeral in 1972 and at Prince Joachim's wedding to Alexandra Manley in 1994.

Charles-Marie Widor's Symphony for Organ No. 5 was played as the recessional music as it was for the wedding between Queen Margrethe II and Prince Henrik of Denmark's wedding almost 37 years before.

Titles upon marriage 
Upon her marriage, Mary embraced the title of her husband and became the Her Royal Highness The Crown Princess of Denmark. Should Frederik eventually ascend to the Danish throne, as expected, Mary would automatically become the Queen consort of Denmark. She was also honoured with the Order of the Elephant, and her father John Donaldson with the grand cross of the Order of the Dannebrog. In accordance with the statutes of the Danish Royal Orders, both of them were granted a personal coat of arms.

On 29 April 2008, Frederik and Mary were also created the Count and the Countess of Monpezat.

Guest list

Danish royalty
 The Queen and Prince Henrik of Denmark, the groom's parents
 Prince Joachim and Princess Alexandra of Denmark, the groom's brother and sister-in-law
 Prince Nikolai of Denmark, the groom's godson and nephew
 The Princess and Prince of Sayn-Wittgenstein-Berleburg, the groom's maternal aunt and uncle
 The Hereditary Prince of Sayn-Wittgenstein-Berleburg, the groom's first cousin
 Princess Alexandra, Countess von Pfeil und Klein-Ellguth and Count Jefferson von Pfeil und Klein-Ellguth, the groom's first cousin and her husband
 Count Richard von Pfeil und Klein-Ellguth, the groom's first cousin once removed 
 Princess Nathalie of Sayn-Wittgenstein-Berleburg, the groom's first cousin
 Queen Anne-Marie and King Constantine II of the Hellenes, the groom's maternal aunt (and godmother) and uncle
 Princess Alexia and Carlos Morales, the groom's first cousin and her husband
 Crown Prince Pavlos and Crown Princess Marie-Chantal of Greece, the groom's first cousin and his wife
 Prince Nikolaos of Greece and Denmark, the groom's first cousin
 Princess Theodora of Greece and Denmark, the groom's first cousin
 Princess Elisabeth of Denmark, the groom's first cousin, once removed
 Count Ingolf and Countess Sussie of Rosenborg, the groom's first cousin, once removed and his wife
 Count Christian and Countess Anne Dorte of Rosenborg, the groom's first cousin, once removed and his wife
 Countess Josephine of Rosenborg and Thomas Schmidt, the groom's second cousin and her husband
 Countess Camilla of Rosenborg and Mikael Rosanes, the groom's second cousin and her husband
 Countess Feodora of Rosenborg and Eric Patte, the groom's second cousin and her fiancée
 Countess Ruth of Rosenborg, widow of the groom's second cousin, twice removed
 Count Axel and Countess Jutta of Rosenborg, the groom's third cousin, once removed, and his wife
 Count Carl Johan of Rosenborg, the groom's third cousin, once removed
 Countess Karin of Rosenborg, widow of the groom's second cousin, twice removed
 Count Valdemar and Countess Charlotte of Rosenborg, the groom's third cousin, once removed, and his wife
 Count Nicolai of Rosenborg, the groom's fourth cousin
 Countess Marina of Rosenborg, the groom's third cousin, once removed
 Christian Castenskiold, the groom's first cousin, twice removed, son of Princess Dagmar of Denmark
 Countess Thyra of Castell-Castell, the groom's second cousin, once removed, granddaughter of Prince Harald of Denmark

Monpezat family
 Countess Françoise Laborde de Monpezat and Claude Bardin, the groom's paternal aunt and uncle
 Xavier Bardin, the groom's paternal cousin
 Antoine Bardin, the groom's paternal cousin
 Guillaume Bardin, the groom's paternal cousin
 Count Étienne and Countess Isabelle Laborde de Monpezat, the groom's paternal uncle and aunt
 Count Raphaël Laborde de Monpezat, the groom's paternal cousin
 Count Bertrand Laborde de Monpezat, the groom's paternal cousin
 Count Arthur Laborde de Monpezat, the groom's paternal cousin
 Count Jean-Baptiste and Countess Jill Laborde de Monpezat, the groom's paternal uncle and aunt
 Countess Clémence Laborde de Monpezat, the groom's paternal cousin
 Count Grégoire Laborde de Monpezat, the groom's paternal cousin
 Countess Maurille Laborde de Monpezat and Jacques Beauvillain, the groom's paternal aunt and uncle
 Pierre Beauvillain, the groom's paternal cousin
 Thomas and Mie Beauvillain, the groom's paternal cousin and his Danish wife
 Anne-Marie and Vincent Diego, the groom's paternal cousin and her husband
 Vincent Beauvillain, the groom's paternal cousin
 Cécile and Jérôme Beuste, the groom's paternal cousin and her husband
 Bénoit Beauvillain, the groom's paternal cousin
 Louis Beauvillain, the groom's paternal cousin

Donaldson family 
 John and Susan Donaldson, the bride's father and stepmother
 Jane and Craig Stephens, the bride's sister and brother-in-law
 Alexander Stephens, the bride's nephew
 Erin Stephens, the bride's niece
 Kate Stephens, the bride's niece
 Patricia and Scott Bailey, the bride's sister and brother-in-law
 Michael Woods, the bride's nephew
 Maddison Woods, the bride's niece
 John and Leanne Donaldson, the bride's brother and sister-in-law
 Ben Moody, the bride's stepbrother
 Peter and Alison Donaldson, the bride's paternal uncle and aunt
 Margaret Howard, the bride's paternal cousin
 Jacqueline and Brendon Johncock, the bride's paternal cousin and her husband
 Alison Donaldson, the bride's paternal cousin
 Roy and John Pugh, the bride's paternal aunt and uncle
 Margaret Cunningham, the bride's paternal grandaunt
 Catherine Murray, the bride's maternal aunt
 Jack and Barbara Maton, the bride's maternal cousin

Foreign royalty

Members of reigning royal families
  The King and Queen of Sweden, The King is the groom's first cousin, once removed, through Gustaf VI Adolf of Sweden
  The Crown Princess of Sweden, the groom's second cousin
  The Duke of Värmland, the groom's second cousin
  The Duchess of Hälsingland and Gästrikland, the groom's second cousin
  Count Carl Johan and Countess Gunnila Bernadotte of Wisborg, The Count is the groom's maternal great-uncle through Gustaf VI Adolf of Sweden
  The King and Queen of Norway, The King is the groom's second cousin, once removed, through Christian IX of Denmark
  The Crown Prince and Crown Princess of Norway, the groom's third cousin and his wife
  Princess Märtha Louise of Norway and Ari Behn, the groom's third cousin and her husband
  The King and Queen of the Belgians, The King is the groom's second cousin, once removed, through Frederick VIII of Denmark
  The Duke and Duchess of Brabant, the groom's third cousin and his wife
  Princess Astrid of Belgium and The Archduke of Austria-Este, the groom's third cousin and her husband
  Prince Laurent and Princess Claire of Belgium, the groom's third cousin and his wife
  The Queen of the Netherlands, The Queen is the groom's fourth cousin, twice removed, through William I of the Netherlands
  The Prince of Orange and Princess Máxima of the Netherlands, the groom's fifth cousin, once removed, and his wife
  Prince Constantijn and Princess Laurentien of the Netherlands, the groom's fifth cousin, once removed, and his wife
  The Queen of Spain The Queen is the groom's third cousin, once removed, through Christian IX of Denmark (representing the King of Spain)
  The Duchess and Duke of Lugo, the groom's fourth cousin and her husband
  The Duchess and Duke of Palma de Mallorca, the groom's fourth cousin and her husband
  The Prince of Asturias and Letizia Ortiz, the groom's fourth cousin and his fiancée
  The Crown Prince of Japan (representing the Emperor of Japan)
  The Earl and Countess of Wessex, The Earl is the groom's third cousin, once removed, through Christian IX of Denmark (representing the Queen of the United Kingdom)
  The Grand Duke and Grand Duchess of Luxembourg, The Grand Duke is the groom's third cousin through Frederick VIII of Denmark
  The Hereditary Grand Duke of Luxembourg, the groom's third cousin, once removed
  Prince Guillaume of Luxembourg, the groom's third cousin
  The Hereditary Prince of Monaco (representing the Prince of Monaco)
  Princess Caroline of Monaco and The Prince of Hanover The Prince is the groom's third cousin, once removed, through Christian IX of Denmark
  Prince Wenzeslaus of Liechtenstein (representing the Prince of Liechtenstein)

Members of non-reigning royal families
 Empress Farah Pahlavi of Iran
 The Aga Khan
 Crown Prince Alexander and Crown Princess Katherine of Yugoslavia, The Crown Prince is the groom's fourth cousin through Christian IX of Denmark
 The Prince of Prussia, The Prince is the groom's third cousin through Frederick Francis III, Grand Duke of Mecklenburg-Schwerin
 Prince Phillip of Hesse, The Prince is the groom's fourth cousin through Queen Victoria
 Princess Xenia of Hohenlohe-Langenburg, The Princess is the groom's fourth cousin through Christian IX of Denmark
 Prince Wilhelm and Princess Ilona of Schaumburg-Lippe, The Prince is the groom's second cousin, once removed, through Frederick VIII of Denmark
 Princess Désirée of Schaumburg-Lippe and Hofjægermester Michael Iuel, the groom's third cousin and her husband
 Princess Eleonore of Schaumburg-Lippe, The Princess is the groom's third cousin through Frederick VIII of Denmark
 The Archduchess of Habsburg-Lorraine
 Prince Dimitri and Princess Dorrit Romanov, The Prince is the groom's third cousin, twice removed, through Nicholas I of Russia
 The Prince and Princess of Turnovo
 The Duke and Duchess of Braganza
 The Prince and Princess of Naples
 The Duke and Duchess of Castro

Politicians and diplomats
  Tarja Halonen, President of Finland, and Dr. Pentti Arajärvi
  Ólafur Ragnar Grímsson, President of Iceland, and Dorrit Moussaieff
  Anders Fogh Rasmussen, Prime Minister of Denmark, and Anne-Mette Rasmussen
  Hans Enoksen, Prime Minister of Greenland, and Aaliiaraq Enoksen
  Jóannes Eidesgaard, Prime Minister of the Faroe Islands, and Anita Joensen
  Bernadette Chirac
  Michael Jeffery, Governor-General of Australia
  Richard Butler, Governor of Tasmania
  Anker Jørgensen, former Prime Minister of Denmark
  Poul Nyrup Rasmussen, former Prime Minister of Denmark, and Lone Dybkjær
  Jonathan Motzfeldt, former Prime Minister of Greenland, and Kristjana Gudmundsdottir
  Edmund Joensen, former Prime Minister of the Faroe Islands, and Edfríö Johnsen
  Jens Kramer Mikkelsen, Lord Mayor of Copenhagen, and Connie Mikkelsen

Nobility
  Count Michael Ahlefeldt-Laurvig-Bille
  Count Gregers Ahlefeldt-Laurvig-Bille, the groom's godson
  Countess Helle Knuth (author and wife of the founder of Knuthenborg Safaripark)
  Count Christoffer Knuth (owner of Knuthenborg)

Other notable guests
 Joen Bille (actor) and Bente Scavenius (art historian)
 Thomas Blachman (jazz musician)
 Tatiana Blatnik (future wife of Prince Nikolaos of Greece and Denmark)
 Bitten Clausen (widow of the founder of Danfoss)
 Jørgen Mads Clausen (chairman of Danfoss), and wife, Anette Nøhr Clausen
 Bent Fabricius-Bjerre (pianist and composer)
 Nils Foss (founder of Foss A/S), and wife, Dorte Foss
 Kjeld (Lieutenant General in the Danish Army) and Birgitta Hillingsø (former classmate of Queen Margrethe II)
 Ellen Hillingsø (Danish actress and goddaughter of Queen Margrethe II), and husband, Christoffer Castenskiold
 Kasper Holten (stage director) and Kamilla Bech Holten (tv host)
 Kjeld Kirk Kristiansen (CEO of The Lego Group), and wife, Camilla Kristiansen
 Bo Lidegaard (historian), and wife, Vibeke Sejrbo Nielsen
 Mærsk Mc-Kinney Møller (shipping magnate)
 Sir Roger Moore (actor), and Danish wife, Lady Kristina Moore
 Else Pedersen (former nanny of the Crown Prince)
 Amber Petty (friend of the bride)
 Thomas Vinterberg (film director), and wife, Maria Vinterberg
 Peter Zobel (businessman), and wife, Henriette Zobel (designer)

Wedding attendants

Bridesmaids and best man
 Jane Stephens, bridesmaid
 Patricia Bailey, bridesmaid
 Amber Petty, bridesmaid
 Prince Joachim of Denmark, the best man

Flower girls and page boys
 Erin Stephens, aged 8 – Mary's niece, daughter of Jane and Craig Stephens
 Kate Stephens, aged 6 – Mary's niece, daughter of Jane and Craig Stephens
 Madisson Woods, aged 8 – Mary's niece, daughter of Patricia Bailey
 Prince Nikolai of Denmark, aged 4 – nephew and godson of Crown Prince Frederik and son of Prince Joachim and Princess Alexandra of Denmark
 Count Richard von Pfeil und Klein-Ellguth, aged 4 – son of Frederik's cousin Princess Alexandra of Sayn-Wittgenstein-Berleburg and Count Jefferson von Pfeil und Klein-Ellguth

Carriage procession
A carriage procession followed the wedding ceremony, during which the couple was transported from Copenhagen Cathedral through the streets of Copenhagen to Amalienborg Palace on a route that was two kilometers long. The couple was transported in the Danish royal family's Barouche from 1906. The newlyweds subsequently appeared with their immediate family on the balcony of Amalienborg Palace in front of more than 20.000 people at Amalienborg's courtyard.

Wedding banquet
The wedding banquet was held on the evening of the wedding day at Fredensborg Palace. The newlyweds arrived in Fredensborg from Amalienborg Palace by carriage, The Prince's Landau, from 1889. Approximately 400 guests were invited for the banquet which took place in a tent in the Palace gardens. Prince Henrik, Queen Margrethe II, John Donaldson and the groom all made speeches during the dinner. After the dinner, Frederik and Mary danced the traditional wedding waltz to "The Wedding Waltz" from Niels W. Gade's A Folk Tale in Fredensborg Palace's Dome Hall. According to tradition, the waltz must take place before midnight which the couple succeeded in despite being slightly behind schedule.

See also
 Frederik, Crown Prince of Denmark
 Mary, Crown Princess of Denmark

References

External links 
 Official Website of the Danish Royal Family

2004 in Denmark
Denmark
2004 in Copenhagen
May 2004 events in Europe
Frederik
Events in Copenhagen